Wadfradad III (also spelled Autophradates II) was the second king of Persis, ruling sometime in the 1st half of the 1st century BC. He was the successor of Darayan I, and was succeeded by his son Darayan II.

References

Sources 
 .
 
 
 
 
 

1st-century BC Iranian people
History of Fars Province
1st-century BC rulers in Asia
Kings of Persis